Navios Maritime Holdings Inc. (“Navios”) is a multinational, vertically integrated seaborne shipping and logistics company focused on the transport and transshipment of drybulk commodities including iron ore, coal and grain. Navios was created in 1954 by US Steel to transport iron ore to the US and Europe. Since then, Navios has diversified geographically and expanded the scope of its business activities such that Navios currently controls 49 vessels totaling approximately 5.1 million deadweight tons.

Navios is a public company listed on the New York Stock Exchange under the symbol “”.

Navios South American Logistics Inc. –subsidiary of “Navios”- consists of a transshipment port/storage facility in Uruguay, an upriver port facility in Paraguay and a well-established barge and cabotage business for wet and dry products.

Navios maintains offices in Piraeus-Greece, New York City-USA, Montevideo-Uruguay, Antwerp-Belgium, Buenos Aires-Argentina and Asuncion-Paraguay.  
The Navios Group of companies includes Navios Maritime Partners, LP, listed on the NYSE under the symbol ‘’ and Navios Maritime Acquisition Corporation, listed on the NYSE under the symbol ‘’.  As a total, Navios Group controls 99 vessels (owned and long term charted-in) and about 10.7 million deadweight tons (70 dry bulk vessels = 7.4 million dwt and 29 tanker vessels = 3.3 million dwt).

Footnotes 

Companies listed on the New York Stock Exchange
Companies based in Piraeus
Shipping companies of Greece